Conakrya is a monotypic genus of Guinean nursery web spiders containing the single species, Conakrya wolffi. It was first described by Günter E. W. Schmidt in 1956, and is only found in Guinea.

See also
 List of Pisauridae species

References

Monotypic Araneomorphae genera
Pisauridae
Spiders of Africa